Fyodor Borisovich Pavlov-Andreevich (Russian: Фёдор Бори́сович Па́влов-Андрее́вич, April 14, 1976) is a Russo-Brazilian artist, curator, and theater director.

Early life and education 
Pavlov-Andreevich was born in Moscow to film historian Boris Pavlov and writer Ludmilla Petrushevskaya. He is the great-grandson of the linguist Nikolay Yakovlev, and the great-great-grandson of the revolutionary Ilya Weger.

He graduated with MA in European literature from Moscow State University's department of journalism in 1999.

In Russia, Pavlov-Andreevich became famous in the 1990s as a young print and television journalist/presenter. At the end of the 1990s, he began to work on producing projects in contemporary culture.

From the 2000s onward, he has worked as a theater director, performance artist, and director of the Solyanka State Gallery in Moscow. He lives in Moscow, São Paulo, and London.

Career 
In 2002, Pavlov-Andreevich made his theatrical debut with 'BiFem', based on the play by Ludmilla Petrushevskaya. In 2003, the play received the New Word ('Novoe slovo') award at the New Drama ('Novaya drama') Festival. Among his other theatrical works are 'Old Women' ('Staroukhy'), a thirty-minute experimental opera based on the Daniil Kharms story that was nominated for two Golden Mask awards in 2010; and 'Andante', a 'dramatic dance' production based on another play by Petrushevskaya, first performed at the Meyerhold Centre in 2016.

Since the end of the 2000s, Pavlov-Andreevich has worked in the field of contemporary art. He has collaborated with Marina Abramović, Serpentine Gallery director Hans-Ulrich Obrist, and MOCA LA director Klaus Biesenbach, and Performa Biennale founder and director RoseLee Goldberg. Marina Abramović once said on Pavlov-Andreevich’s practice: "His art is capable of surprising us with ever new ways of seeing the world we live in." Pavlov-Andreevich's solo presentations have been shown at the Garage Museum of Contemporary Art (Moscow), the Künstlerhaus (Vienna), Faena Arts Center (Buenos Aires), the CCBB Cultural Center (Brasilia), Deitch Projects (New York City), ICA (Institute of Contemporary Arts, London), MAC USP Museum and SESC Cultural Center (both São Paulo), among the others.

Pavlov-Andreevich earned international recognition thanks to one of his guerrilla performances, 'The Foundling', in which a nude Pavlov-Andreevich, encased in a glass box, was literally thrown into a series of society events without their organizers' permission. Among them were the gala opening of the new building of the Garage Museum of Contemporary Art in Moscow, a dinner by French patron François Pinault at the Venice Biennale, and the Met Gala in New York. During the performance at the Met Gala on May 2, 2017, he was arrested by New York City police for trespassing on private property and public nudity, then sent to Central Booking prison, where he spent 24 hours.

His series of performances, Temporary Monuments (2014–2017), along with solo shows by the same name at Moscow's Pechersky Gallery (2016) and the Museum of Contemporary Art at the University of São Paulo (2017), was dedicated to the problem of contemporary slavery in Brazil and Russia. In each of the seven performances in the series, the artist immersed himself in the conditions which slaves were (or are) forced to endure. In one of them (Pau de Arara), he submits himself to a type of medieval torture still used by the Brazilian police's special forces; in another (O Tigre), he performs a Brazilian slave ritualistic punishment, in which a person must cross Rio de Janeiro while carrying a basket of sewage on their head

Pavlov-Andreevich's artistic practice focuses on three subjects: the distance between the spectator and the work of art in performance, the temporality and vulnerability of the human body, and the connection between the sacred and the obscene.

As British art historian Adrian Heathfield puts it, ‘...Fyodor is making powerful work in a performance art lineage that deals with power, bodies and participation. He’s also something of brilliant interventionist - his Foundling performances have caused quite a stir...’

Works in collections 
- MAR museum, Rio de Janeiro, Brazil

- MMoMA museum, Moscow, Russia

- Blavatnik Family Foundation, New York, USA

- Tsukanov Family Foundation, London, UK

- Inlusartiz Institute, Rio de Janeiro, Brazil

Selected solo shows and performances 
2021 - Humble Works, three-artists show (with Marina Abramović and Nico Vascellari). Colnaghi, London

2021 - The 44 Cards, performance,  as part of ‘Adventures Of The Body’ solo show. Ground Solyanka Gallery, Moscow

2021 - The Sharp Rocks, performance. São Paulo
  
2019 - Decorative Sacredness, solo show. Gazelli Art House. London

2018 - The 42 Cards, performance, 32º Festival de Arte de Porto Alegre. Porto Alegre

2018 – O Batatodromo, performance, as a part of group show Do Disturb. Palais de Tokyo, Paris

2018 – Temporary Monument №0, performance, as a part of group show her shey qayidacaq. Gazelli Art House, London

2017 – Fyodor's Performance Carousel-3, site specific installation in collaboration with 7 performance artists. Sesc Consolação, São Paulo

2017 – Adventures of the Body, solo show. Baró Galeria, São Paulo

2017 – Temporary Monuments, solo show. MAC-USP, São Paulo

2016 – Temporary Monuments, solo show. Pechersky Gallery, Moscow

2016 – Foundling-4, guerrilla intervention. Bienal de São Paulo, São Paulo

2016 – Fyodor's Performance Carousel-2, site specific installation in collaboration with 8 performance artists, curated by Felicitas Thun-Hohenstein. Künstlerhaus, Vienna

2016 – A Portrait with the Artist and Void, a long durational performance. Museu de arte moderna (MAM-SP), São Paulo

2015 – Pyotr & Fyodor, 24-hour performance conversation with artist Pyotr Bystrov, curated by Daria Demekhina and Anna Shpilko. Solyanka State Gallery, Moscow

2015 – O Batatodromo, solo show, curated by Marcello Dantas. Centro Cultural Banco do Brasil, Brasilia

2015 – Foundling-3, guerrilla intervention. Christie's Vanity Fair Party, London

2015 – Os Caquis (The Persimmons), performance, curated by Bernardo Mosqueira. EAV Parque Lage, Rio de Janeiro

2015 – Foundling-2, guerrilla intervention. Garage Museum of Contemporary Art opening, Moscow

2015 – Foundling-1, guerrilla intervention. Venice Biennale gala dinner, Fondation Pinault, Palazzo Cini, Venice

2014 – Fyodor's Performance Carousel-1, site specific installation in collaboration with 8 performance artists. Faena Arts Center, Buenos Aires

2013 – Laughterlife, site specific installations, sculptures, performance, curated by Marcio Harum, commissioned by Centro Cultural São Paulo. Casa Modernista, São Paulo

2013 – Walk Away Until I Stay, performance, part of The Two Rings series. MKAD, Moscow

2013 – Empty Bus, performance, part of The Two Rings series. Garden Ring, Moscow

2012 – Walk on My Shame, installation and performance, curated by Kathy Grayson, in collaboration with Matthew Stone, as part of New-Revisions, Frieze Week. NEO Bankside, London

2011 – Photobody, solo show, as part of Non-Stage, Istanbul Biennale. Commissioned by Galerie Non, Istanbul

2010 – The Great Vodka River, mixed-media installation and performance, curated by Katya Krylova. Presented by Luciana Brito Galeria as part of Art Public, curated by Patrick Charpenel at Art Basel Miami Beach, Miami

2010 – My Water Is Your Water, mixed-media installation and performance, curated by Maria Montero. Luciana Brito Galeria (under the framework of Bienal de São Paulo), São Paulo

2010 – Egobox, performance, co-curated by Klaus Biesenbach and Roselee Goldberg. Garage Center for Contemporary Culture, Moscow

2010 – Flick Me on My Memory, performance. Galerie Volker Diehl, Berlin

2010 – Whose Smell Is This?, site specific installation and performance. The Armory Show, Volta art fairs, New York City

2009 – A Portrait with the Artist and Child, performance. Galerie Stanislas Bourgain, Paris

2009 – Hygiene, performance. Deitch Projects, New York City

2009 – I Eat Me, solo show. Paradise Row Gallery, London

2008 – Hunger Meditation, mixed media installation, 3-channel video and performance. Galerie Stanislas Bourgain, Paris

Selected group shows 
2017 – Pieter Bruegel. A Topsy-Turvy World, curated by Antonio Geuza. Artplay Design Center, Moscow

2015 – Trajetórias em Processo, curated by Guilherme Bueno. Galeria Anita Schwartz, Rio de Janeiro

2013 – Artists' Zoo. Solyanka State Gallery, Moscow

2013 – Our Darkness, curated by Viktor Neumann. Laznia Centre for Contemporary Art, Gdansk, Poland

2011 – 9 Days, curated by Olga Topunova. Solyanka State Gallery, Moscow

2009 – Play: A Festival of Fun, curated by Lauren Prakke and Nick Hackworth. Paradise Row Gallery, London

2009 — Marina Abramović Presents, curated by Hans Ulrich Obrist and Maria Balshaw. Manchester International Festival, Whitworth Gallery, Manchester

2008 – At Play 1. South Hill Park, London

2008 – Laughterlife. Paradise Row Gallery, London

2008 – Spazi Aperti. Romanian Academy, Rome

Selected theatre projects 
2019 (July and November) – Yelena. Praktika Theatre, Moscow

2017 – Yelena. Praktika Theatre, Moscow

2016 – Andante. Meyerhold Centre, Moscow

2015 – Three Tricks of Silence. Meyerhold centre, Moscow

2013–2014 – Tango-Quadrat. Meyerhold Centre, Moscow

2012 – Bakari. A.R.T.O. Theatre, Moscow

2012 – The Rescue. The Lyric Theatre, London

2010 – Staroukhy. Barents Spektakel Festival, Kirkenes, Norway; also performed at Baibakov Art Projects, Moscow

2008 – Elizaveta Bam. Theatro Technis, London

2004 – BiFem. Institute of Contemporary Arts, London

References

External links 
 Official website
 Baró Gallery: Fyodor Pavlov-Andreevich
 Galerie Stanislas Bourgain: Fyodor Pavlov-Andreevich
 Pechersky Gallery: Fyodor Pavlov-Andreevich

Russian performance artists
1976 births
Living people